aka Molester's Train: Dirty Behavior and  is a 1993 Japanese pink film directed by Hisayasu Satō under the pseudonym Hisakazu Hata as part of the Molester's Train series. Future director, Shinji Imaoka worked on the project as assistant director, and prolific screenwriter Kyōko Godai wrote the film. It was named the second best pink film release of the year at the annual Pink Grand Prix.

Synopsis
After the loss of her boyfriend, a young woman plans to blow herself up with a stick of dynamite on her 20th birthday. On the subway, she meets a young man who films women while molesting them. The two become romantically involved.

Cast
 Yumika Hayashi
 Koichi Imaizumi (今泉浩一)
 Kiyomi Ito
 Yuri Ishihara (石原ゆり)
 Hiroyuki Kawasaki (川崎浩幸)

Background

Future Academy Award-winner Yōjirō Takita started the long-running Molester's Train series at Shintōhō Eiga. The original series ran for twelve episodes between 1982 and 1985 and was in a light-comic vein similar to early U.S. nudie-cuties such as Russ Meyer's The Immoral Mr. Teas (1959). The popularity of the "Molester" theme led other pink film studios to create their own versions of the series. When they decided to resurrect the series in 1993, Shintōhō Eiga chose to go in an entirely different direction by hiring controversial, cult-film director Hisayasu Satō to helm the project.

Critical appraisal
Allmovie writes that, working within Shintōhō Eiga's Molester's Train series format, Molester's Train: Nasty Behavior is, "much tamer than [Hisayasu Satō's] usual sadistic gorefests", and that his fans, "may be disappointed that there is nary a rape, whipping, or bloody tooth extraction in sight". The review speculates that the softening in tone from Satō may be a result of the input from Kyōko Godai. Godai is a prolific pink film screenwriter and wife of actor-director Yutaka Ikejima.

In their Japanese Cinema Encyclopedia: The Sex Films, the Weissers note that in Molester's Train: Nasty Behavior, Satō shows none of his characteristic cinematic brutality. They write of his comparatively tamer films with Godai, "Some praise Sato for the change, while other lose interest in his career". Nevertheless, Jasper Sharp writes that Satō's film still has an austere tone which is completely different in style from Yōjirō Takita's light-hearted Molester Train films. Sharp notes that Molester's Train: Nasty Behavior exhibits many of Satō's usual interests, including a sequence employing a "disorienting labyrinth of gazes" involving the young male molester, his films, his victim on the train, another molester's victim, and the audience. The audience is given little help in how to interpret the proceedings. "Who do we identify with," Sharp asks, "molester, molested or cameraman, or do we remain just a detached observer?"

Bibliography

English

Japanese

References

1993 films
Shintōhō Eiga films
Films directed by Hisayasu Satō
Molester's Train
1990s Japanese-language films
1990s Japanese films